Amir Reza Khadem Azghadi (born February 10, 1970) is an Iranian wrestler who won Olympic bronze medals in 1992 and 1996. He finished fourth at the 2000 Summer Olympics, and he won the 1991 World Championships, He also won a bronze medal at the 1990 World Championships and the 1992 and 1993 Asian Championships and a silver medal at the 1991 Asian Championships and the 1994 Asian Games.

He was trained by his father Mohammad Khadem, and his younger brother Rasoul Khadem  and ebrahim khadem doctor and another world champion and an Olympic gold medalist of freestyle wrestling.

He is currently Vice Minister of Youth Affairs and Sports in Legal, Parliamentary and Provincial Affairs, has been appointed for the position on 30 December 2013.

References

External links
  profile
 

1970 births
Living people
People from Mashhad
Olympic wrestlers of Iran
Olympic bronze medalists for Iran
Wrestlers at the 1988 Summer Olympics
Wrestlers at the 1992 Summer Olympics
Wrestlers at the 1996 Summer Olympics
Wrestlers at the 2000 Summer Olympics
Iranian male sport wrestlers
Asian Games gold medalists for Iran
Olympic medalists in wrestling
Iranian sportsperson-politicians
Asian Games medalists in wrestling
Wrestlers at the 1994 Asian Games
Members of the 7th Islamic Consultative Assembly
World Wrestling Championships medalists
Alliance of Builders of Islamic Iran politicians
Medalists at the 1996 Summer Olympics
Medalists at the 1992 Summer Olympics
Medalists at the 1994 Asian Games
Recipients of the Order of Courage (Iran)
Asian Wrestling Championships medalists
World Wrestling Champions